Kernan may refer to:

People

Surname
Catherine Kernan (born 1948), American artist
Edward Kernan (1771–1844), Irish clergyman
Francis Kernan (1816–1892), American politician
Francis Joseph Kernan (1859-1945), American general
James Kernan (born 1958), Irish equestrian
James Lawrence Kernan (1838–1912), American theater manager and philanthropist 
Joe Kernan (disambiguation), several people
Joseph D. Kernan (born 1955), American admiral
Michael Kernan (1927–2005), American journalist and book author
Michael J. Kernan (1884–1953), New York politician
William F. Kernan (born 1946), American general

Given name
Kernan "Skip" Hand (born 1945), Louisiana politician defeated by Kathleen Blanco

Places
Kernan, County Down, a townland in Tullylish, County Down, Northern Ireland, United Kingdom
Kernan, County Armagh, a townland in County Armagh, Northern Ireland, United Kingdom
Kernan, Illinois, an unincorporated community, United States

Other
James Lawrence Kernan Hospital, hospital located in Woodlawn, Maryland, United States

See also
 McKiernan Clan
 McKernan (surname)
 McKiernan
 McTiernan
 McTernan
 Kiernan
 Tiernan
 Kernen, a municipality in Germany
 Joe Kernen (born 1956), American news anchor